Shigemasa (written: 重政 or 重昌) is a masculine Japanese given name. Notable people with the name include:

Shigemasa Higaki (born 1971), Japanese golfer
, Japanese daimyō
, Japanese ukiyo-e artist
, Japanese daimyō
, Japanese daimyō
, Japanese samurai

See also
6567 Shigemasa, main-belt asteroid

Japanese masculine given names